The State Register of Heritage Places is maintained by the Heritage Council of Western Australia. , 44 places are heritage-listed in the Shire of Menzies, of which 13 are on the State Register of Heritage Places.

List
The Western Australian State Register of Heritage Places, lists the following 13 state registered places within the Shire of Menzies:

References

Menzies
 
Menzies